William Wavell Wakefield, 1st Baron Wakefield of Kendal (10 March 1898 – 12 August 1983), known as Sir Wavell Wakefield between 1944 and 1963, was an English rugby union player for Harlequins, Leicester Tigers and England, President of the Rugby Football Union and Conservative politician.

Background and education
Wakefield was born in Beckenham, Kent, the son of Roger William Wakefield. He was the brother of Sir Edward Wakefield, 1st Baronet, also a Conservative politician. His youngest brother, Roger Cuthbert Wakefield, was an early British & Irish Lion, touring on the 1927 British Lions tour to Argentina. He attended Sedbergh School in Cumbria, leaving during the First World War to join the Royal Naval Air Service at the Admiralty testing station at Hill of Oaks on Windermere. After returning from the war he took a degree in mechanical sciences (engineering) from Pembroke College, Cambridge, graduating in 1923.

Rugby career
After the war Wakefield became the captain of the RAF rugby team and joined Harlequins. On 11 October 1919, he made his debut for Harlequins against Richmond and he continued to play for the club for the next ten years. He occasionally played for other teams during this time, but Harlequins was always his main club. During his career with Harlequins, he appeared a total of 136 times, including 82 as captain, and he made his final appearance on 25 January 1930 against Cambridge University. He scored 51 tries for the club, along with one penalty and 14 conversions. He was club captain in the seasons 1920/21, 1924/25 and 1927/28 to 1929/30.  Wakefield played for Leicester Tigers between 1921 and 1924 playing 29 games and scoring 10 tries.  He was captain in all but one game he played for the club.

In 1920, Wakefield made his England debut against Wales. He captained the Cambridge University team in 1922. In total, he appeared for England 31 times and was captain on 13 occasions. He led England to back-to-back Grand Slams. His final appearance for England was against France in April 1927. Through his career, Wakefield's influence on the game was pronounced. As an excellent all-round athlete he helped revolutionise the role of the back row forward. Prior to Wakefield their role was mainly static—pushing in the set scrum and winning the ball in loose scrums (or rucks, as they later became). Wakefield's athleticism enabled him to play a more dynamic role: pressuring the opposition half backs in defence and supporting the attacks of the three quarters, and these remain the prime responsibilities of the modern open side flank forward. Rugby historian Barry Bowker described Wakefield thus; "A complete footballer, he had all the attributes – strength, weight and speed – of a great forward. He was a master of the art of dribbling with pace, was up with his backs to share in an attack and took and gave passes well".

He remained involved in rugby and was the RFU president in 1950. From 1950 to 1980 he was president of Harlequins. An all-round sportsman, Wakefield also became the president of the Ski Club of Great Britain, the British Sub-Aqua Club and the British Water Ski Federation. In 1999 Wakefield was inducted as the first English member of the International Rugby Hall of Fame.

Business and political career
In 1931, Wakefield joined the Rediffusion radio company. In 1935, he moved into politics, becoming Conservative Member of Parliament (MP) for Swindon. At the 1945 general election, he moved to St Marylebone. He was knighted in 1944 and in 1963, upon retiring from Parliament, was raised to the peerage as Baron Wakefield of Kendal, of Kendal in the County of Westmorland. For many years he was an active member of the Conservative Monday Club.

1945 general election and the Hampstead "anti-alien" petition
In August 1945 The Jewish Chronicle reported that "antisemitism on the part of [Conservative] party supporters had led many local political associations not to select Jewish candidates". During the election campaign of that year, Conservative candidate Wavell Wakefield said that Jewish refugees should be repatriated to solve London's housing crisis.

Apart from his sporting and political careers Wakefield was instrumental in the preservation of the Ullswater 'Steamers' and the Ravenglass & Eskdale Railway, through his Lake District Estates company. In 1954, Wakefield bought a controlling shareholding in Ullswater 'Steamers', saving the company from bankruptcy. In 1960, along with Midlands stockbroker Colin Gilbert, he purchased the Ravenglass & Eskdale Railway from the Keswick Granite Company in order to prevent its closure. After Colin Gilbert's death in 1968, he became the sole owner. Upon Wakefield's death, his daughter, the Hon. Joan Raynsford OBE, took over as the head director of the railway company. His other two daughters, Sheila Hensman OBE and Ruth Adorian OBE, also became active directors.

Personal life
Lord Wakefield of Kendal died in August 1983, aged 85, when the barony became extinct.

References

External links 

1898 births
1983 deaths
Alumni of Pembroke College, Cambridge
British sportsperson-politicians
Cambridge University R.U.F.C. players
Conservative Party (UK) MPs for English constituencies
England international rugby union players
English rugby union players
Harlequin F.C. players
Knights Bachelor
Leicester Tigers players
Middlesex County RFU players
Hereditary barons created by Elizabeth II
People educated at Sedbergh School
Ravenglass and Eskdale Railway
Royal Air Force officers
Royal Air Force personnel of World War I
Royal Air Force rugby union players
Royal Naval Air Service personnel of World War I
Royal Navy officers of World War I
Rugby players and officials awarded knighthoods
Rugby union players from Beckenham
UK MPs 1935–1945
UK MPs 1945–1950
UK MPs 1950–1951
UK MPs 1951–1955
UK MPs 1955–1959
UK MPs 1959–1964
UK MPs who were granted peerages
World Rugby Hall of Fame inductees
Rugby union flankers
Wavell